Packardia elegans, the elegant tailed slug moth, is a species of moth in the family Limacodidae. It is found in Canada and the United States, where it has been recorded from woodlands and forests, ranging from north-eastern Missouri to Quebec and Maine, south to north-eastern Georgia.

The length of the forewings is 10–12 mm. The forewings are peppery grey with indistinct white lines.

The larvae feed on various woody plants, including beech, cherry and oak.

Subspecies
 Packardia elegans elegans
 Packardia elegans fusca (Packard, 1864)

See also 
 List of moths of North America (MONA 4618-5509)

References 

  The Life-Histories of the New York Slug Caterpillars. XIII-XIV. Harrison G. Dyar, Journal of the New York Entomological Society, Vol. 6, No. 1 (Mar., 1898), page 5 (JStor Stable URL)

External links 

 
 Packardia elegans at insectoid.info

Limacodidae
Moths described in 1864
Moths of North America
Taxa named by Alpheus Spring Packard